Oullo is a town in the Oury Department of Balé Province in southern Burkina Faso. As of 1996 the town had a total population of 2,118.

References

Populated places in the Boucle du Mouhoun Region